The swing ride or chair swing ride (sometimes called a swing carousel, wave swinger, yo-yo, waver swinger, Chair-O-Planes, Dodo or swinger) is an amusement ride that is a variation on the carousel in which the seats are suspended from the rotating top of the carousel. On some versions, particularly on the Wave Swingers, the rotating top of the carousel also tilts for additional variations of motion.

History
Swing rides were present at the earliest amusement parks. At Idora Park in Oakland, California, in 1908, the ride was called the Flying Swing, but appears to be the same principle.

The Chair-O-Planes premiered in Germany in 1972, designed by Zierer and built by Franz Schwarzkopf, brother of Anton Schwarzkopf. In 1974 the first portable unit debuted under the same partnership. Since then Zierer has built about 200 units. Other manufacturers have followed creating their own versions of the Chair-O-Planes including Zamperla, Chance Rides, Grover Watkins, Bertazzon, Preston & Barbieri, Vekoma and Sanoyas Hishino Meisho.

In the late 2000s, Austrian manufacturer Funtime developed the world's first tower swinger known as the Star Flyer. Mondial followed with their WindSeeker resulting in a lawsuit between the two companies. Zamperla also sells a Vertical Swing.

Locations

Europe

Austria

Denmark
The Star Flyer, located in Tivoli Gardens, Copenhagen, affords sweeping views of the city's historical centre.
The Swing Carousel also located in Tivoli Gardens Copenhagen.

France
Les Chaises Volantes in Walibi Sud-Ouest is a Zierer model from 1987 which was relocated to the park in 1992.

Germany 
In Germany, swing rides are often found on fairs, Volksfests like the Oktoberfest and traveling funfairs. But swing rides are also common in amusement parks. Most of the German swing rides are from Zierer.

Some of these include:

 Africa Swing - Safariland Stukenbrock (Wooddesign Amusement Rides BV)
 Fliegenpilz - Eifelpark (Zierer)
 Flying Carousel - Wunderland Kalkar (Zamperla)
 Himmelsstürmer - Taunus Wunderland (Zierer)
 La Ola - Heide Park (Zierer)
 Kettenflieger - Fränkisches Wunderland
 Kettenflieger - Hansa-Park Wooddesign Amusement Rides BV
 Kettenkarussell - Ritter Rost Magic Park Verden
 Kettenkarussell - Schwaben Park 
 Kettenkarussell - Skyline Park (Zierer)
 Königsflug - Bayern Park (Zierer)
 Pier Side Carousel - Movie Park Germany (Zierer)
 Sea Swing - Movie Park Germany (Zamperla)
 Wellenflieger - Fort Fun Abenteuerland (Zierer)
 Wellenflieger - Freizeit-Land Geiselwind (Zierer)
 Wellenfliegerpilz - Erlebnispark Steinau (Zierer)
 Wellenflug - Holiday Park (Wooddesign Rides B. V.)
 Wellenflug - Phantasialand (Zierer)
 Wiener Wellenflieger - Europa-Park (Zierer)
 Wirbelpilz - Erlebnispark Tripsdrill (Zierer)
 Zonga Kettenflieger - Serengeti Park (SBF Visa)

Netherlands
Attractiepark Slagharen located the same Chair-O-Plane as Loundoun Castle.

Some Swing rides in the Netherlands:

 Djinn - Toverland (Wooddesign Rides B. V.)
 K3 Slingermolen - Plopsa Indoor Coevorden
 Kettenflug Apollo - Attractiepark Slagharen (Schwarzkopf)
 Piraat Enterhaak! - Avonturenpark Hellendoorn (Zierer)
 Super Swing - Walibi Holland (Zierer)

Norway

Second largest amusement park in the Nordic countries is TusenFryd located  outside the capital Oslo in Norway. TusenFryd is the home of a Wellenflieger named "Sverrehusken" and has been in operation since 1988. Sverrehusken is the first of its kind in the Nordic countries.

In Kongeparken located 10 km outside the fourth largest city in Norway, Stavanger is the home of a Wellenflieger named "Spinnvidle" and has been in operation since 2012. Spinnvidle is the first of its kind in Norway with double seats.

Sweden
The Swedish name for Swing ride is Slänggunga or Kättingflygare. At Gröna Lund, Stockholm a swing ride with the name "Eclipse" can be found. With its  it shares the "world's second tallest" title with SkyScreamer in Texas, North America.

The biggest amusement park in the Nordic countries is Liseberg in Sweden's second largest city Gothenburg. Liseberg is the home of a Swing ride named "Slänggungan".

Spain
 Diavolo - Tibidabo (Zierer)
 Fumanchú (Defunct) - Port Aventura (Zierer)
 Los Ícaros - Terra Mítica (Zierer)
 Sillas Voladoras - Parque de Atracciones de Madrid (Zierer)
 Sillas Voladoras de Mr. Freeze - Parque Warner Madrid (Zierer)
 Star Flyer - Parque de Atracciones de Madrid (Funtime)
 Vertical Twister - Parque de Atracciones de Zaragoza (Zamperla)

United Kingdom

Loudoun Castle Theme Park in Scotland claimed that its moon-shaped ride, "The Plough", was the largest Chair-O-Plane in the world. The Plough was originally called Apollo 14 and was owned by the Bembom family, operating in their Ponypark Slagharen in the Netherlands during the late seventies. It had gondolas travelling around the outside of the ride. When moved to Dreamland in England (then called "Bembom Brothers"), it was reconstructed into a Chair-O-Plane and named Heatwave. Leaving Dreamland, it opened in Lightwater Valley in 1998 where it operated until 2003 when Henk Bembom moved Heatwave to his new park, Loudoun Castle, where it was renamed "The Plough" and painted green. The park has been closed since 2010.

Until 2016 there was a Chair-O-Plane ride at Alton Towers in Staffordshire. Called Twirling Toadstool it was set in a fantasy themed area of the park called Cloud Cukoo Land, it was themed as a giant mushroom. This was formerly themed as a prehistoric dinosaur-type ride and located in an area called Ug Land.

You can also find a Chair-O-Plane at Carters Steam Fair which is one of the largest vintage travelling funfairs including some steam driven rides. Their ride's past is a little patchy but is thought to have been built in Germany in the 1920s and imported to Britain with a blank canvas. It's generally the case that British roundabouts run clockwise, whereas their Continental and American counterparts run anti-clockwise. The Chair-o-Plane certainly runs the right direction to be a British-built ride, but it may have been adapted by an early owner. 

Adventure Island has a Chair-O-Plane called Archelon, which was themed to the extinct species of turtle of the same name.

Chessington World of Adventures is home to a monkey-themed Chair-O-Planes, named the 'Monkey Swinger', that squirts water at riders. This formerly had a theme based on Billy Whizz of The Beano.

Paultons Park is also home to a Chair-O-Planes called 'The Sky Swinger'. This ride opened in 2008 and is a Zierer model.

Butlins is home to three Chair-O-Planes, one at each site located at Butlins Minehead, Butlins Bognor Regis and Butlins Skegness. Butlins Minehead is home to a Zierer Wave Swinger and the other two resorts manufacturers are unknown.

North America

Most of the swing carousel rides in North America are found in amusement parks. They are usually made by Zierer (which calls the ride Wave Swinger), although some are made by Bertazzon (which calls the ride Swing Carousel) or Zamperla (which calls the ride Flying Carousel and Lollyswings).

Some of these include:
Aviator - Kemah Boardwalk
Bluegrass Breeze - Beech Bend Park (Bertazzon)
Charlie Brown's Wind Up — Kings Island (Zamperla)
Crime Wave — Six Flags New England (Zierer)
Crow's Nest (Formerly Sparkler) — Holiday World & Splashin' Safari (Zamperla Vertical Swing)
 Backyardigans Swing-Along - Nickelodeon Universe (Zierer)
Da Vinci's Dream — Canobie Lake Park
DC Super-Villains Swing — Six Flags Over Georgia (Zierer)
DC Super-Villains Swing — Six Flags Fiesta Texas (Zierer)
DC Super-Villains Swing — Six Flags Great America (Zierer)
der Werbelwind — Busch Gardens Williamsburg (Zierer)
Dream Machine — Calaway Park (Moser)
Elmo's Cloud Chaser-Sesame Place (Zamperla)
Eye of the Kraken — Swampy Jack's Wongo Adventure (ARM)
Fiesta Swing — Wonderland Amusement Park (Chance Rides)
Flying Catousel — Park at OWA (Zamperla Flying Carousel)
Flying Swings — Waldameer Park (Zamperla)
Freedom Flyer — Park at OWA (Zamperla Vertical Swing)
Gulf Glider — Galveston Island Historic Pleasure Pier (Bertazzon)
The Gunslinger — Six Flags Over Texas (Chance Rides)
HallowSwings — Holiday World & Splashin' Safari (Zamperla Flying Carousel)
Italian Trapeze — Knoebels (Zamperla)
Lasso — Darien Lake (Zierer)
Lolly Swing — South Florida Fair (Zamperla)
 Vertigo - South Florida Fair (ARM)
New England SkyScreamer— Six Flags New England (Funtime)
North Star — Valleyfair (Funtime)
Seaswings — Santa Cruz Beach Boardwalk (Bertazzon)
Silly Symphony Swings — Disney California Adventure Park (Zierer)
Skycatcher — Kentucky Kingdom (ARM Rides)
SkyScreamer — Six Flags Discovery Kingdom (Funtime)
SkyScreamer — Six Flags Fiesta Texas (Funtime)
SkyScreamer — Six Flags Great Adventure (Funtime)
SkyScreamer — Six Flags Over Georgia (Funtime)
SkyScreamer — Six Flags St. Louis (Funtime)
Texas SkyScreamer — Six Flags Over Texas (Funtime)
SteelHawk — Worlds of Fun (Mondial)
Storm Chaser — Adventureland_(Iowa) (Mondial)
Swing Carousel — Silver Dollar City (Bertazzon)
Swing of the Century — Galaxyland  (Zierer)
Swing of the Century — Canada's Wonderland (Zierer)
Texas Star Flyer — Galveston Island Historic Pleasure Pier (Funtime)
Tour de Ville — La Ronde (Zamperla)
Turn of the Century — Elitch Gardens (Zierer)
Turn of the Century — Lagoon Amusement Park (Zierer)
Vol Ultime — La Ronde (Funtime)
Waltzing Swinger — Dollywood (Bertazzon) 
Wave Swinger — Cedar Point (Zierer)
Wave Swinger — Magic Mountain (Zierer)
Wave Swinger — Dorney Park & Wildwater Kingdom (Zierer)
Wave Swinger — Funtastic
Wave Swinger - Six Flags Discovery Kingdom (Zierer)
Wave Swinger — Hersheypark
Wave Swinger - Lake Winnepesaukah
Wave Swinger — Kennywood (Zierer)
Wave Swinger — Kings Dominion (Zierer)
Wave Swinger — Knott's Berry Farm (Zierer)
Wave Swinger — Lake Compounce (Zierer)
Wave Swinger — Playland
Wave Swinger — South Florida Fair 2005–2009
Wave Swinger — Saudi Amusement, Dammam KSA
Wave Swinger — Seabreeze Amusement Park
Wave Swinger — Strates Shows (Zierer)
Wave Swinger —   J&J Amusements   Zierer
Wave Swinger — Bengtson Pumpkin Farm Homer Glen, Illinois
Wave Swinger —   J&J Amusements   Zierer
Whirligig — Six Flags Fiesta Texas (Zierer)
Whirligig — Six Flags Great America (Zierer)
WindSeeker — Canada's Wonderland (Mondial)
WindSeeker — Carowinds (Mondial)
WindSeeker — Cedar Point (Mondial)
WindSeeker — Kings Dominion (Mondial)
WindSeeker — Kings Island (Mondial)
Yo Yo - Alabama Splash Adventure (Chance Rides) 
Yo Yo — South Florida Fair (Chance Rides)
Yo Yo --- Family Kingdom Amusement Park (Chance Rides)
Yo Yo — West Coast Amusements
Yo-Yo — Fun Spot USA (Chance Rides)
Yo-Yo — Quassy Amusement Park(Chance Rides)
Zephyr — Kings Island (Zierer)
Vertigo - South Florida Fair and West Palm Fair (ARM)
Zweefmolen — Dutch Village, Holland, Michigan

South America
Trukis Di Pinguim - Hopi Hari (Vinhedo, São Paulo, Brazil)
Vertical Swing - Mundo Aventura Bogota, Colombia
Fly Over - Fantasilandia, Santiago, Chile
Sillas Voladoras - Salitre Mágico Bogota, Colombia

Asia and Oceania
 Unknown - Luna Park (Yerevan, Armenia)
 Unknown(Zierer)- Yerevan Park (Yerevan, Armenia) 
Ontang-anting — Taman Impian Jaya Ancol (Dunia Fantasi) (Jakarta, Indonesia)
Flying Fiesta - Philippines (Enchanted Kingdom)
Cyclone - Adventure Island (New Delhi, India)
Vòng xoay thần tốc - Đầm Sen Park (Vietnam)
The Thunderbirds - Dream World (Thailand)

Australia
Puss in Boots Sword Swing — Dreamworld (DreamWorks Experience)
Volare - Luna Park Sydney (Preston & Barbieri)
Wave Swing — Royal Adelaide Show

New Zealand
 Chair-o-Plane - Mahons Amusements (Carnival Ride Operator)

Malaysia
Spinner — Genting Highlands (Genting Highlands Theme Park)
Spinner had dismantled due to the Genting Outdoor Theme Park has been closed since 1 September 2013 to make way for the world's first 20th Century Fox World, due to be completed by 2021.

Africa

South Africa
 Wave Swing - Gold Reef City

Popular culture
In Italy, most of the Chair-O-Planes travel with fairs. The ride is called Seggiolini volanti ("Flying chairs") or calcinculo, which literally means "kick in the bottom", from the ingenious way used to grab the high-placed "tail" and win a free ride. Two people sit in contiguous seats, and the one sitting behind kicks the friend higher in the air.

The Metalocalypse episode "Motherklok" features a Wave Slinger.

A Chair-O-Planes is featured on the cover of Dave Matthews Band's 1994 album Under the Table and Dreaming. The liner note credit lists the site of this photo as Sandusky, Ohio, which is the location of Cedar Point.

In John Updike's short story "You'll Never Know Dear How Much I Love You" he mentions a WhirloGig.

At the end of the Lilo & Stitch: The Series episode "Short Stuff", Experiment 297, a crab-like alien who was accidentally enlarged by his creator Jumba Jookiba's growth ray and given the name "Shortstuff", has the ability to swivel his body from the waist up. He was allowed to stay at his enlarged size by being employed as a living swing ride for a carnival as his "one true place".

References

External links

 
Articles containing video clips